The National Poisons Information Service is an information service commissioned by Public Health England on behalf of the UK health departments. Poisoning accounts for 1% of NHS admissions. Pesticides used in agriculture (particularly organophosphorus insecticides) are extremely toxic, but 87% of around 120,000 annual poisoning cases in the UK take place in the home.

History
In August 1962 the Ministry of Health announced it was forming a poisons information service. This was after the Emergency Treatment in Hospital of Cases of Acute Poisoning published by the Central Health Services Council in March 1962. Many more household chemicals were on the market, and the chemical composition was only known to the manufacturers. 4,000 to 5,000 people each year were lethally poisoned, with 6,085 in 1962; however, many of the deaths were (non-accidental) suicides.

It started in 1963 by Dr Roy Goulding at the Medical Toxicology Unit of Guy's Hospital, with a staff of 65. By the late 1960s, recreational drugs were presenting a widespread danger. Other centres were soon set up in Edinburgh, Belfast and Cardiff.

UKTIS was based in Newcastle from 1995.

Structure
It has four units in Birmingham, Cardiff, Edinburgh and Newcastle. It is a member of the European Association of Poisons Centres and Clinical Toxicologists.

 NPIS Birmingham Unit (West Midlands Poisons Unit), City Hospital, Birmingham - Dr Sally Bradberry
 NPIS Cardiff Unit, Llandough Hospital - Dr Laurence Gray
 NPIS Edinburgh Unit (Scottish Poisons Information Bureau), Royal Infirmary of Edinburgh - Dr. Euan Sandilands.
 NPIS Newcastle Unit, Regional Drug and Therapeutics Centre, Newcastle University - Professor Simon Thomas

NPIS Birmingham has the NPIS Product Data Centre, provided by manufacturer's information, and deals with around 2,300 companies.

NPIS supports (24 hours) NHS Direct (for England and Wales) and (24 hours) NHS 24 for Scotland. Northern Ireland has its Northern Ireland Regional Medicines and Poisons Information Service in Belfast, and NPIS is used when this is not available. The Republic of Ireland uses the service, via the TOXBASE database, which is used by the country's National Poisons Information Centre.

Of all UK nations, Wales has the highest proportionate number of enquiries to the service, with Northern Ireland the fewest. Within England, there is a distribution of higher number of enquiries to the service in the north than the south, with NHS North East having the highest and NHS South of England having the least proportionate number of enquiries. The vast majority (95%) of enquiries come from A&E departments. Around 65% of poisoning is from pharmaceuticals (paracetamol, ibuprofen, citalopram, diazepam and zopiclone) and 15% from household chemicals (detergents, bleach, and isopropanol). There are very dangerous chemicals stored in most UK kitchens.

Wednesday is the busiest day of the week for enquiries, with the fewest at the weekend.

Function
The NPIS operates a 24-hour telephone advice service and internet database TOXBASE (www.toxbase.org for registered healthcare departments only). TOXBASE is free for UK NHS departments, and available by subscription to departments outwith the UK NHS. The TOXBASE app is also available for Apple and Android devices. The app is free for individual NHS users.

The TOXBASE database contains information on approximately 17,000 products, together with generic advice on the management of poisoning. In excess of 1.5 million product accesses are made to the database each year. Most of the accesses are made by A&E staff.

NHS 111, NHS 24 and NHS Direct all use the TOXBASE database. In the UK poisons information can also be found in the British National Formulary.

See also
 College of Emergency Medicine
 DrugScope
 Porton Down

References

External links
 NPIS
 TOXBASE
 UKTIS
 UKMi
 EAPCCT

1963 establishments in the United Kingdom
Drugs in the United Kingdom
Medical and health organisations based in the United Kingdom
Medical research institutes in the United Kingdom
National Health Service
Poison control centers
Public Health England
Toxicology in the United Kingdom